The Severnaya Railway (Северная железная дорога; "Northern Railway") is a railway network linking Moscow with Arkhangelsk on the coast of the Arctic Ocean. It runs through Arkhangelsk, Komi, Vologda, Kostroma, Yaroslavl, Ivanovo, and Vladimir regions of the Russian Federation.

Northern Railway counts its age from 15 September 1868 when its first part, Shuya-Ivanovo Railway connecting Ivanovo, Shuya and Novki, was opened.

The Yaroslavl Railway, owned by Savva Mamontov, was one of the first railways in Russia. The Alexandrov–Yaroslavl–Vologda line was opened in 1872. There are several monuments to Savva Mamontov along the road. The original Moscow–Yaroslavl Mainline is no longer operated from Yaroslavl; it was transferred to the Moscow Railway in 1959.

Yaroslavl-Vologda-Arkhangelsk line 
In 1894, the construction of the railway connecting Vologda with Arkhangelsk started. The decision was taken to construct the line along the shortest route, which at the time ran through a sparsely populated area, and not along one of the existing trading routes, via Kargopol or Verkhovazhye. The construction was completed in 1897. Line Yaroslavl - Vologda - Arkhangelsk was built with 1067mm gauge. Terminal station in Yaroslavl was located on opposite bank of Volga River. 

In 1913, a railway bridge in Yaroslavl was built, line Yaroslavl - Vologda regauged to 1524 mm. Vologda - Arkhangelsk line regauged to 1524mm in 1914–1918.

The Cherepovets–Vologda–Vyatka(Kirov) line has been in operation since 1906. It is a link joining the Northern Railway to the Perm Railway further to the east. They form the original, or northern, route of the great Trans-Siberian Railway. A long railway to the mining town of Vorkuta, known as the Pechora Mainline, was constructed by Gulag labor between 1937 and 1941. Its headquarters were in Kotlas.

Yaroslavl-Kostroma line 

The Yaroslavl - Kostroma line opened in 1887. The first Kostroma terminal located in far bank of the Volga. 

In 1932 the line was re-routed over a new bridge closer to the city. In 1956 this line was extended northbound from Kostroma to Galich, and created a spare line for Transsib route.

Nowadays the Northern Railway is a subsidiary of the Russian Railways. Its total length is 5956 km. The headquarters are on the Volga Embankment in Yaroslavl. Its branches are based in Yaroslavl, Vologda, Arkhangelsk, Solvychegodsk, and Sosnogorsk.

References

External links 
 Official website

Railway lines in Russia
Railway lines opened in 1872
Rail transport in Yaroslavl Oblast
Rail transport in Vologda Oblast
Rail transport in Arkhangelsk Oblast
Rail transport in Kostroma Oblast
Rail transport in the Komi Republic
1953 establishments in the Soviet Union